Antidesmateae is a tribe of the plant family Phyllanthaceae. It comprises 5 subtribes and 9 genera.

Subtribes and genera
, the Germplasm Resources Information Network (GRIN) accepted the following subtribes and genera:
Subtribe Antidesmatinae
Antidesma
Thecacoris
Subtribe Hieronyminae:
Hieronyma
Subtribe Hymenocardiinae:
Didymocistus
Hymenocardia
Subtribe Leptonematinae:
Leptonema
Subtribe Martretiinae:
Apodiscus
Martretia
Unplaced:
Chonocentrum

See also 
 List of Phyllanthaceae genera

References 

Phyllanthaceae
Malpighiales tribes